There are many distinct styles and schools of martial arts.  Sometimes, schools or styles are introduced by individual teachers or masters, or as a brand name by a specific gym. Martial arts can be grouped by type or focus, or alternatively by regional origin. This article focuses on the latter grouping of these unique styles of martial arts.

For Hybrid martial arts, as they originated from the late 19th century and especially after 1950, it may be impossible to identify unique or predominant regional origins. It is not trivial to distinguish "traditional" from "modern" martial arts. Chronology is not the decisive criterion, as, for example, "traditional" Taekwondo was developed in the 1950s, while the "modern" hybrid martial art of Bartitsu was developed in ca. 1900.

A large portion of traditional martial arts can be categorized as Folk wrestling (see the separate article), although in some cases a folk wrestling style and a modern combat sport may overlap or become indistinguishable from each other once the sport has been regulated.

Africa

Angola
Engolo

Egypt
Tahtib

Madagascar
Moraingy

Nigeria
Dambe

Senegal
Lutte Traditionnelle
Senegalese wrestling

Somalia
Istunka

South Africa
Nguni stick-fighting

Sudan
Nuba fighting

Americas

Barbados
Bajan stick-licking
Brazil
Brazilian jiu-jitsu
Capoeira
Huka-huka
Luta Livre
Vale Tudo

Canada
Defendo
Okichitaw
SPEAR System
Wen-Do

Colombia
Colombian grima

Cuba
Juego de maní

Haiti
Tire machèt

United States
American Kenpo
Collegiate wrestling
Combatives
Emerson Combat Systems
Gouging (fighting style)
Jeet Kune Do
Jailhouse rock (fighting style)
Kajukenbo
Kapu Kuialua
LINE (combat system)
Marine Corps Martial Arts Program
Model Mugging
Shootfighting
Special Combat Aggressive Reactionary System
10th Planet Jiu-Jitsu

Asia

Bangladesh
Bangladeshi martial arts
Butthan

China
Chinese martial arts
Shaolin Kung Fu
Baguazhang
Tai chi
Bajiquan
Wing Chun
Shuai Jiao
Choy Gar
Fut Gar

India
Indian martial arts
Mardani khel
Malla-yuddha
Kalaripayattu
Vajra-mushti
Adimurai
Gatka

Indonesia
Indonesian martial arts
Pencak silat
Tarung Derajat

Israel
Kapap
Krav Maga

Japan
Japanese martial arts
Aikido
Kenjutsu
Karate
Sojutsu
Naginatajutsu
Bojutsu
Okinawan kobudo
Iaido
Kusarigamajutsu
Kendo
Kyudo
Tessenjutsu
Shurikenjutsu
Bajutsu
Jujutsu

Korea
Korean martial arts
Taekkyon
Tae kwon do
Hap ki do
Laos
Muay Lao

Malaysia
Silat

Mongolia
Mongolian wrestling

Myanmar
Aka (Burmese martial arts)
Bando
Banshay
Lethwei
Naban
Pongyi thaing

Cambodia
Bokator
Pradal serey

Philippines
Filipino martial arts

Thailand
Krabi–krabong
Lerdrit
Muay boran
Muay Thai
Silat Pattani

Turkey
Matrak
Oil Wrestling
Sayokan

Vietnam
Vietnamese martial arts

Sri Lanka
Angampora

Europe

Finland
Hokutoryu Ju-Jutsu

France
Canne de combat
French school of fencing
Gouren
Qwan Ki Do
Savate

Germany
German school of fencing
Ringen
Unifight
German Ju-Jutsu

Serbia
Real Aikido

Greece
Ancient Greek boxing
Greek wrestling
Pankration

Iceland
Glima

Italy
Italian martial arts

Republic of Ireland
Irish martial arts

Spain
Leonese wrestling
Lucha Canaria

Russia
Russian martial arts
Sambo
Systema

Switzerland
Schwingen

Ukraine
Combat Hopak

United Kingdom
Bare-knuckle boxing
Bartitsu
Catch wrestling
Combat pistol shooting
Cornish Wrestling
Cumberland and Westmorland wrestling
Defendu
Devon wrestling
English Longsword School
Historical fencing in Scotland
Lancashire wrestling
Suffrajitsu
Singlestick
Shin-kicking
Scottish Backhold
World War II combatives

Others
Archery
Boxing
Duel
Fencing
Shooting
Wrestling

Oceania

Australia
Coreeda

New Zealand
Mau rākau

Samoa
Limalama

See also

List of martial arts weapons
List of practice weapons
Outline of martial arts

Martial arts
Martial arts-related lists